Santiago Rodríguez Masagó (c. 1809 – 27 May 1879), also known as Santiago Rodríguez, nicknamed "Chago" was a Dominican military leader. Little is known of his birth but sources suggest that he was either born in Cap-Haïtien or the area of Fort-Liberté (in a part where it is present day Dajabón). He is known for having opposed the annexation of the Dominican Republic to Spain and then having fought the Spanish Crown; and for being one of the rebels of the famous El Grito de Capotillo that began the Dominican Restoration War with General Gregorio Luperón.

Early years
Although little is known about his origin, many historians agree that the son of the landowner Vicente Rodríguez (of Dominican descent), and Josefina Masagó (of Haitian descent), two wealthy merchants from the city of Santiago in the Dominican Republic.

Military career
After the Restoration of the country, Rodríguez held various military occupations.

Death and legacy
He died on May 24, 1879 in Agua Clara, Sabaneta Spanish.

References

1809 births
1879 deaths
19th-century rebels
Dominican Republic independence activists
Dominican Republic revolutionaries
People of the Dominican Restoration War 
People from Nord-Est (department)
Dominican Republic military personnel
Dominican Republic people of Haitian descent